David Valentine may refer to:

David H. Valentine (1912–1987), British botanist
Dave Valentine (1926–1976), Scottish rugby player